S. L. Bhojegowda belongs to the Janata Dal (Secular).

References

External links
 https://www.ndtv.com/karnataka-news/bjp-wins-3-of-6-karnataka-legislative-council-seats-jds-congress-gets-rest-1867133

Living people
Janata Dal (Secular) politicians
Year of birth missing (living people)